Snežana (Cyrillic: Снежана), also transliterated Snezhana, is a Slavic, Circassian, and Lithuanian feminine given name, possibly derived from sneg ("snow") and žena ("woman"). It is popular in former Yugoslavia, Russia and Bulgaria. Other spellings include Snježana and Sniježana, found in Ijekavian-speaking areas (Croatia, Bosnia and Herzegovina including Republika Srpska, Montenegro). Snežana was the fifth most popular name in North Macedonia in 2011. In the decade from 1960 to 1970 Snežana was the most popular name in Serbia. Based on research conducted on 31 December 2007 by the Statistical Office of Slovenia, Snežana and Sergei were the 198th most common personal names in Slovenia.

Variations

Notable people named Snežana
Snežana Rodič
Snežana Pajkić
Snežana Aleksić
Snežana Bogdanović
Snežana Hrepevnik
Snežana Pantić
Snežana Babić
Snežana Malović
Snežana Samardžić-Marković
Snežana Prorok
Snežana Nikšić
Snežana Zorić
Snežana Maleševič

See also
 Slavic names

Notes

Bulgarian feminine given names
Circassian feminine given names
Croatian feminine given names
Macedonian feminine given names
Russian feminine given names
Serbian feminine given names
Slavic feminine given names
Slovene feminine given names
Ukrainian feminine given names